Ceviche is a Latin American dish typically made from fresh raw fish cured in fresh citrus juices, most commonly lime  or lemon. It is also spiced with ají, chili peppers or other seasonings, and julienned red onions, salt, and cilantro are also added.

Because the dish is eaten raw and not cooked with heat, it must be prepared fresh and consumed immediately to minimize the risk of food poisoning. Ceviche is often eaten as an appetizer; if eaten as a main dish, it is usually accompanied by side dishes that complement its flavors, such as sweet potato, lettuce, maize, avocado, or cooking banana.

The dish is popular in the Pacific coastal regions of western South America. The origin of ceviche is from the ancient Moche culture and Vicús culture, which today corresponds to the modern day countries of Peru and Ecuador. The technique of macerating raw fish and meat in vinegar, citrus, and spices (escabeche) was brought to the Americas from Spain and is linked to the Muslim heritage in Spanish cuisine. However, archeological records suggest that something resembling ceviche may have been indigenous to western South America as early as 2,000 years ago.

The dominant position Lima held through four centuries as the capital of the Viceroyalty of Peru, at one point included most of western South America allowed ceviche to be brought to other Spanish administrative provinces in the region, and in time becoming local cuisine incorporating regional flavors and styles.

Etymology 

The first documented evidence of the term  is from 1820, in the song "La Chicha," sung by Peruvian soldiers.

According to the Royal Spanish Academy, the word has the same etymology as the Spanish term , which derives from Mozarabic , in turn descending from Andalusian Arabic , which also derives from Classical Arabic  (meaning meat cooked in vinegar).

History 
Various explanations of ceviche's origin exist, with Peruvian ultra nationalists favoring a Pre-Hispanic and exclusively Peruvian origin. According to some historic sources from Peru, the predecessor of ceviche originated among the Moche, a coastal civilization that began to flourish in current-day northern Peru and southern Ecuador nearly 2000 years ago. The Moche used the fermented juice from the local banana passionfruit. Recent investigations further show that during the Inca Empire, fish was marinated with chicha, an Andean fermented beverage. Different chronicles also report that along the Incan coast before the arrival of Spaniards, fish was consumed with salt and ají.

Nevertheless, most historians agree that ceviche originated during colonial times in present-day Peru and Ecuador. They propose that the predecessor to the dish was brought to the area by Andalusian women of Moorish background who accompanied the Conquistadors and that this dish eventually evolved into what nowadays is considered ceviche. The Peruvian chef Gastón Acurio further explains that the dominant position that Lima held throughout four centuries as the capital of the Viceroyalty of Peru allowed for popular dishes such as ceviche to be brought to other Spanish colonies in the region and to eventually become a part of local cuisine by incorporating regional flavors and styles.

The Peruvian origin of the dish is supported by chefs including the Chilean Christopher Carpentier and the Spaniard Ferran Adrià, who in an interview stated, "Cebiche was born in Peru, and so the authentic and genuine [cebiche] is Peruvian."

Of the different stories that exist about the origin of the ceviche, we only know that it is Peru and Ecuador, the two countries that dispute this denomination, perhaps because they were the ones that the Incas influenced; however, the first recipe of this dish deserves to Manual Atanasio Fuentes in “The Guide of Lima.”

Its origin is also attributed to places ranging from Central America to the Polynesia in the South Pacific. In Ecuador, it could have had its origins in coastal civilizations, as both Peru have shared cultural heritages (such as the Inca Empire) and a wide variety of fish and shellfish. The Spanish, who brought citrus fruits such as the lime from Europe, pmay have originated the dish in Spain with roots in moorish cuisine. Fernando Rueda García, historian Málaga and a member of the Andalusian Ethnology Commission, suggests that it was Moorish slaves who created the cebiche by mixing local and foreign ingredients that were arriving on the Península.

Preparation and variants 
Ceviche is marinated in a citrus-based mixture, with lemons and limes most commonly used. In addition to adding flavor, the citric acid causes the proteins in the seafood to become denatured, appearing to be cooked. Acid marinades will not kill bacteria or parasitic worms, unlike the heat of cooking. Traditional-style ceviche was marinated for about three hours. Modern-style ceviche, popularized in the 1970s, usually has a very short marinating period. The appropriate fish can marinate in the time it takes to mix the ingredients, serve, and carry the ceviche to the table.

Most Latin American countries have given ceviche its own touch of individuality by adding their own particular garnishes.

South America 
In Peru, ceviche has been declared part of the country's national heritage and has even had a holiday declared in its honor. The classic Peruvian ceviche is composed of chunks of raw fish, marinated in freshly squeezed key lime, with sliced onions, chili peppers, salt and pepper. Corvina or cebo (sea bass) was the fish traditionally used. The mixture was traditionally marinated for several hours and served at room temperature, with chunks of corn on the cob and slices of cooked sweet potato. Regional or contemporary variations include garlic, fish bone broth, minced Peruvian ají limo, or the Andean chili rocoto, toasted corn or cancha and yuyo (seaweed). A specialty of Trujillo is ceviche prepared from shark (tollo or tojo). Lenguado (sole) is often used in Lima. The modern version of Peruvian ceviche, similar to the method used in making Japanese sashimi, consists of fish marinated for a few minutes and served promptly. It was developed in the 1970s by Peruvian-Japanese chefs, including Dario Matsufuji and Humberto Sato.  Many Peruvian cevicherías serve a small glass of the marinade, which is called leche de tigre or leche de pantera, as an appetizer along with the fish.

In Ecuador, the classic ceviche is made up of pieces of fish pickled in lemon juice and cooked  or shrimp cooked using the tomato juice or water along with the shrimp shells, with sliced red onions, sliced tomatoes, salt, pepper, cilantro, and oil. The mixture is traditionally marinated for several hours and served with a bowl of toasted corn kernels as a side dish; fried green plantain chunks called "patacones", or thinly sliced plantain chips called chifles. In some regions, ceviche is served with rice on the side. Ceviches in Ecuador are seasoned with tomato sauce, mustard, and oil. The Manabí style, made with lemon juice, salt, and the juice provided by the cooked shrimp itself, and sometimes topped with peanut butter, is very popular. Occasionally, ceviche is made with various types of local shellfish, such as black clam (cooked or raw), oysters (cooked or raw), spondylus (raw), barnacles (cooked percebes), among others mostly cooked.  Well-cooked sea bass (corvina) or bicuda (picudo), octopus, and crab ceviches are also common in Ecuador. In all ceviches, red onion, lemon juice, cilantro, salt, and oil are ubiquitous ingredients.

In Chile, ceviche is often made with fillets of halibut or Patagonian toothfish and marinated in lime and grapefruit juices; finely minced garlic and red chili peppers and often fresh mint and cilantro are added. On Easter Island, the preferred fish is tuna, marinated in lemon juice and coconut milk.

North and Central America and the Caribbean 

In Mexico, the U.S., and some parts of Central America, it is served either in cocktail cups with tostadas or as a tostada topping and taco filling. In Mexico, when served in a cup with tomato sauce, it is called a ceviche cocktail. Shrimp, octopus, squid, tuna, and mackerel are also popular bases for Mexican ceviche. The marinade ingredients include salt, lime, onion, chili peppers, avocado, and cilantro (coriander). Cut olives and tomatoes are often added to the preparation.

In El Salvador and Nicaragua, one popular ceviche recipe is ceviche de concha negra ("black conch ceviche"), known in Mexico as pata de mula ("mule's foot"). It is dark, nearly black, with a distinct look and flavor. It is prepared with lime juice, onion, yerba buena, salt, pepper, tomato, Worcestershire sauce, and sometimes picante (any hot sauce or any kind of hot pepper) as desired.

The dish includes marinated fish, lime juice, salt, ground black pepper, finely minced onions, cilantro, and finely minced peppers in Nicaragua and Costa Rica. It is usually served in a cocktail glass with a lettuce leaf and soda crackers on the side, as in Mexico. Popular condiments are tomato ketchup, mayonnaise, and Tabasco sauce. The fish is typically tilapia or corvina, although mahi-mahi, shark, and marlin are also popular.

In Panama, ceviche is prepared with lemon juice, chopped onion, celery, cilantro, assorted peppers, and sea salt. Ceviche made with corvina (white sea bass) is very popular and is served as an appetizer in most local restaurants. It is also commonly prepared with octopus, shrimp, and squid or served with small pastry shells called "canastitas."

In the Caribbean, ceviche is often made using mahi-mahi prepared with lime juice, salt, onion, green pepper, habanero, and a touch of allspice. Squid and tuna are also popular. In Puerto Rico and other places in the Caribbean, the dish is prepared with coconut milk. In the Bahamas and south Florida, a conch ceviche known as conch salad is very popular. It is prepared by marinating diced fresh conch in lime, chopped onions,  and bell pepper. Diced pequin pepper or Scotch bonnet pepper is often added for spice. In south Florida, it is common to encounter a variation to which tomato juice has been added.

Health risks 
Bad sanitary conditions in its preparation may lead to illness. Aside from contaminants, raw seafood can also be the vector for various pathogens, viral and bacterial, as well as larger parasitic creatures. According to the United States Food and Drug Administration and studies since 2009, specific microbial hazards in ceviche include Anisakis simplex, Diphyllobothrium spp., Pseudoterranova decipiens and Pseudoterranova cattani, and Vibrio parahaemolyticus. Anisakiasis is a zoonotic disease caused by the ingestion of larval nematodes in raw seafood dishes such as ceviche. The Latin American cholera outbreaks in the 1990s may have been attributed to the consumption of raw cholera-infested seafood that was eaten as ceviche.

The American Dietetic Association urges women to avoid ceviche during pregnancy due to the health risks it introduces if not prepared properly.

See also 

  marinated in vinegar, garlic and parsley eaten in Spain
 , cooked or raw fish or meats in an acidic marinade
 , sometimes referred to as "Philippine ceviche"

References

Bibliography 
 
 
 
 
 
 
 
 
 

Bahamian cuisine
Belizean cuisine
Chilean cuisine
Citrus dishes
Colombian cuisine
Costa Rican cuisine
Ecuadorian cuisine
Fish dishes
Florida cuisine
Guatemalan cuisine
Mexican cuisine
National dishes
Nicaraguan cuisine
Panamanian cuisine
Peruvian cuisine
Pascuense cuisine
Puerto Rican cuisine
Salvadoran cuisine
Uncooked fish dishes
Potentially dangerous food